Ambérieux, also known as Ambérieux-d'Azergues, is a commune in the Rhône department and the region of Auvergne-Rhône-Alpes, eastern France.

See also
Communes of the Rhône department
Azergues

References

Communes of Rhône (department)
Lyonnais
Ambarri